TRW may refer to:

Businesses
 TRW Inc., an aerospace and automotive company
 TRW Automotive, vehicle maker
 Experian, a credit agency (formerly TRW Information Systems)

Other uses
 The Real World (TV series), an American reality show
 Bonriki International Airport, Kiribati (IATA code: TRW)